"Strasbourg" is a song by English indie rock band the Rakes, from their 2005 debut album, Capture/Release. Released on 27 September 2004, it was the second single taken from the album. It charted on the UK Singles Chart at No. 57. The song was featured in the video game FIFA 06.

Track listing
7" vinyl (B00030NU8G)
"Strasbourg" (2:30)
"Just Got Paid" (1:49)
"Ausland Mission" (3:43)
"T Bone" (3:36)

References

2004 songs
2004 singles
The Rakes songs
Mercury Records singles